Kevin Lee McArthur  (born May 11, 1962) is a former American football linebacker in the National Football League. He played for the New York Jets. He played college football for the Lamar Cardinals. He is a member of Omega Psi Phi.

References

1962 births
Living people
American football linebackers
New York Jets players
Lamar Cardinals football players
Players of American football from Louisiana
People from Cameron Parish, Louisiana